China–Brazil Earth Resources Satellite 1 (CBERS-1), also known as Ziyuan I-01 or Ziyuan 1A (ZY 1, ZY 1A), is a remote sensing satellite which was operated as part of the China–Brazil Earth Resources Satellite program between the China National Space Administration and Brazil's National Institute for Space Research. The first CBERS satellite to fly, it was launched by China in 1999.

CBERS-1 was a  spacecraft built by the China Academy of Space Technology and based on the Phoenix-Eye 1 satellite bus. The spacecraft was powered by a single solar array, providing 1,100 watts of electricity for the satellite's systems.

A Chang Zheng 4B carrier rocket, operated by the China Academy of Launch Vehicle Technology, was used to launch CBERS-1. The launch took place at 03:15 UTC on 14 October 1999, using Launch Complex 7 at the Taiyuan Satellite Launch Centre. The satellite was successfully placed into a sun-synchronous orbit.

CBERS-1 was decommissioned in September 2003, almost four years after launch.

References

Spacecraft launched in 1999
China–Brazil Earth Resources Satellite program
Earth observation satellites of Brazil
Satellites of China
1999 in China
Spacecraft launched by Long March rockets
Derelict satellites orbiting Earth